Ronning, Rønning, or Rönning can mean:

People

 Carol Ronning Kapsner, justice of North Dakota Supreme Court
 Chester Ronning, Canadian politician
 Cliff Ronning, ice hockey player
 Eldar Rønning, Norwegian skier
 Frode Rønning, Norwegian sprinter
 Geir Rönning, Norwegian musician in Sweden and Finland
 Nils Nilsen Ronning, also N. N. Rønning, a Norwegian-American journalist and author
 Thomas Ronning, American chef/pastry chef 
 Ron Ng, Hong Kong TVB actor and singer
 
Place
 Ronning Gardens, British Columbia